Thongchai Akkarapong (born 19 February 1976) is a Thai retired professional footballer who played as an attacking midfielder.

External links
 

1977 births
Living people
Thongchai Akkarapong
Thongchai Akkarapong
Association football midfielders
Thongchai Akkarapong
Thongchai Akkarapong
Thongchai Akkarapong
Kelantan FA players
Thongchai Akkarapong
Thongchai Akkarapong
Thongchai Akkarapong
Thongchai Akkarapong
Thongchai Akkarapong
Expatriate footballers in Malaysia
Thongchai Akkarapong